Inaechelys is an extinct genus of bothremydid pleurodiran turtle that was discovered in the Maria Farinha Formation of Brazil. The genus consists solely of type species I. pernambucensis.

Discovery 
Inaechelys was discovered in the Poty Cement Quarry, in Paulista, Brazil in 2005, by a team from the Federal University of Pernambuco. The holotype consists of a carapace, which is fragmented but almost complete. The mesoplastron is not preserved, though its outline is still visible. The anal notch is small, semicircular and wider than it is deep.

References 

Bothremydidae
Prehistoric turtle genera
Paleocene turtles
Danian life
Tiupampan
Paleogene reptiles of South America
Paleogene Brazil
Fossils of Brazil
Fossil taxa described in 2016
Monotypic turtle genera